Toxoides undulatus is a moth in the family Drepanidae. It was described by Frederic Moore in 1867. It is found in India, Myanmar, Nepal, Vietnam, Thailand and Yunnan, China.

The forewings are dark ferruginous brown, suffused with grey broadly from the posterior angle. There are numerous transverse blackish pale-bordered undulating lines, and a marginal lunulated line. The hindwings are a brownish-fawn colour.

References

Moths described in 1867
Thyatirinae